Portsmouth Abbey School is a coeducational Benedictine boarding and day school for students in grades 9 to 12. Founded in 1926 by the English Benedictine community, the School is located on a 525-acre campus along Rhode Island's Narragansett Bay.

History
The school and monastery are located on land originally owned by the Freeborn family beginning in the 1650s. The land was later owned by the Anthony family, and in 1778 it was the site of the Battle of Rhode Island during the American Revolution. In 1864, Amos Smith, a Providence financier, built what is now known as the Manor House and created a gentleman's farm on the site with the help of architect Richard Upjohn. After buying the Manor House and surrounding land in 1918, Dom Leonard Sargent of Boston, a convert from the Episcopal Church, founded Portsmouth Priory on October 18, 1918. The priory was founded as, and remains, a house of the English Benedictine Congregation. It is one of only three American houses in the congregation, and maintains a unique connection with sister schools in England, including Ampleforth College and Downside School.

The school was founded in 1926 as Portsmouth Priory by John Hugh Diman, a Benedictine monk, and a former Episcopalian. Portsmouth was not Diman's first school. In 1896, Diman founded Diman's School for Small Boys - later, St. George's School - in Middletown, Rhode Island. In 1912, aware that St. George's School catered to the sons of more affluent families and eager to provide educational opportunities to working-class students, Diman founded the Diman Vocational School in Fall River, MA. A conversion experience brought Diman to Catholicism and ultimately to the Benedictines who were just beginning a priory in Portsmouth. After joining the Order of Saint Benedict, Diman was again moved to found a school. In 1926, Diman founded the Portsmouth Priory School, which would be redesignated as Portsmouth Abbey School - indicating the increased size of its monastic community - in 1969.

Originally, Portsmouth Priory offered a classical education to boys. Using the British "public" school model, the Priory School employed a form system, and supplemented a student's education with co-curricular activities, such as athletics and the arts. The same British system along with an updated and much expanded selection of co-curricular offerings are still at the core of a Portsmouth Abbey School education today.

Many of the buildings were designed by post-modern architect Pietro Belluschi, dean of the architecture and planning school at the Massachusetts Institute of Technology.

A parcel of the school's land is leased to The Aquidneck Club (formerly the Carnegie Abbey Club) where the student golf team practices and holds its interscholastic golf matches.

Portsmouth Abbey School today
Today the school, often referred to as "the Abbey," has students from 17 nations and 26 states. Its enrollment totals over 350 students, living in the school's eight residential Houses or commuting from nearby towns.

Internet access is available in computer labs and all House libraries. The average size for a class is 12 to 14 students, with a student-teacher ratio of 7 to 1. Activities and clubs include the Appalachia Service Project, The Beacon (the student newspaper), The Raven (the art and literary magazine), Scriptorium (scholarly journal), The Gregorian (yearbook), Model United Nations, New England Math League, Future Problem Solvers, Big Brothers and Big Sisters, Community Service Projects, Debate Club, Red Key (campus tour guides), Social Committee, Astronomy Club, Peer Tutors, Pro Deo Orchestra, Student Athletic Advisory Board, Teens Leading Children (TLC), and Student Council. The school also has a fine arts center, a photography lab and darkroom, a digital art studio, an art gallery (which alternatively displays traveling exhibits and selected student work), a drama program (which produces three plays per year, including the annual musical), a music tech lab, voice and instrumental offerings, and private music lessons.

In 2006, the school installed a Vestas V47-660 kW wind turbine, the first such project in Rhode Island, to provide forty percent of the school's electricity.

Other green initiatives at Portsmouth Abbey School include the construction of two energy efficient faculty residences in September 2011, "unfolded" on campus by Blu Homes, a company building eco-friendly, prefabricated homes.

In addition, one of Portsmouth Abbey School's girls' residential houses, St. Brigid's, and the newest boys' residential house, St. Martin's, employ a number of conservation features, including recycled wood and low-VOC construction materials; hot-water solar panels; flooring materials from renewable and recycled sources; energy-recovery ventilators; low-flow shower heads and toilets; and high-efficiency/low-emission Viessmann boilers. In 2019, the School completed construction of a 34,123 square-foot LEED Gold certified science building.

Portsmouth Abbey School's security and maintenance departments operate two electric vehicles on campus, and the School's dining services department has implemented a "tray-less" dining program, a composting program, and a partnership with Newport Biodiesel (the School provides the waste cooking oil used by its dining services to Newport Biodiesel for clean-burning alternative fuel).

Each office on campus maintains paper and plastic recycling bins, and the Portsmouth Abbey School Alumni Bulletin, the School's bi-annual magazine, is printed on FSC-certified paper, a product group from well-managed forests and other controlled sources.

Athletics
In addition to The Aquidneck Club golf course next door available for use by the faculty and by the golf team, the school's athletic facilities include eight squash courts and a fitness center, a six-lane, all-weather track, a multi-sport synthetic turf field, six tennis courts, an indoor ice hockey rink, two gymnasiums, and multiple outdoor playing fields.

Portsmouth Abbey is a member of the Eastern Independent League and has occasional contests against ISL (Independent School League) schools and other non-league boarding and day schools in New England. The Abbey's rivals include St. George's School and Pomfret School. Teams include a sailing team, golf team, wrestling team, squash team, tennis team, lacrosse team, softball team, field hockey team, baseball team, cross country team, basketball team, track & field teams, and a football team. Equestrian activities are offered at Abbey Club's Equestrian Center adjacent to the School. Portsmouth Abbey School's co-ed varsity sailors were New England champions in 2009, 2010 and 2013; they competed in Nationals in four of the past five years, earning 4th Place nationally in 2013.

Traditions
The school has a number of traditions such as the Raven Cup, a year-long school-spirit competition among the student residential houses; a six-day week with classes on Saturday mornings followed by athletics games; the Headmaster's Run, an annual all-School run through the fall campus; and a required year of Latin language study.

In the center of the School campus is a large quadrangle called the Holy Lawn that is used exclusively for commencement exercises.

Notable art on campus

The Abbey's Church of St. Gregory the Great contains a wire sculpture titled Trinity, created by the late American sculptor Richard Lippold in 1960. The sculpture is made of a 22,000 foot web of gold plated wire surrounding a gold and silver Crucifix, created by Meinrad Burch. The sculpture underwent an award-winning restoration in 2009, carried out by Newmans’ Ltd., of Newport, Rhode Island.

Notable alumni
Deon Anderson, former NFL player. He transferred after his sophomore season
Keith Botsford, 1944, American/European writer, collaborator with Saul Bellow, professor emeritus at Boston University and editor of News from the Republic of Letters. 
Christopher Buckley, 1970, American political satirist, son of William F. Buckley Jr.
Robert Crichton, 1944, author of The Secret of Santa Vittoria and The Great Impostor
R. F. Patrick Cronin, 1942, dean of faculty of medicine at McGill University (1972–1977).
Charlie Day, 1994, writer, actor and an executive producer of the series It's Always Sunny in Philadelphia.
Jonathan DeFelice, 1965, president emeritus of Saint Anselm College; founder of the Association of Benedictine Colleges and Universities.
William A. Dembski, transferred to University of Chicago in 1977 and received an honorary diploma in 1988, mathematician, philosopher, and theologian; proponent of concept of intelligent design. 
E.J. Dionne, 1969, Washington Post columnist and Senior Fellow at the Brookings Institution.
John Gregory Dunne, 1950, novelist (True Confessions; The Red, White and Blue; Playland), screenwriter (A Star Is Born, co-authored with his wife, writer Joan Didion), and literary critic.
Michael Egan, 1944, former U. S. associate attorney general (Carter Administration); former Georgia state senator; member of Georgia House of Representatives
Phil English, 1974, U.S. representative (R-PA) 3rd District, 1995–2009.
James D. (Jim) Farley, Jr.,1981, 1981, an American automotive executive who currently serves as Ford Motor Company's chief executive officer.
Benedict Fitzgerald, 1967, an American screenwriter who co-wrote the screenplay for The Passion of the Christ with Mel Gibson.
Peter Fitzgerald, 1978, U.S. senator (R-IL), 1999–2005.
Peter M. Flanigan, 1941, founder of Student Sponsor Partnership; financier; deputy campaign manager (1968) and assistant to President Richard M. Nixon.
Richard Fremantle, 1954, American art historian.
William Haney, III '80, filmmakerand inventor - has won a Humanitarian Award from Harvard Medical School, a Distinguished Service Award from the Senior Olympics, the Slow Food Prize, a Genesis Award, an Achievement Award from the ACLU, the Pare Lorentz Award, The Gabriel Prize, A Silver Hugo, The Earthwatch Award, A Marine Conservation Award, Amnesty International Award, and was chosen Global Leader of Tomorrow by the World Economic Forum.
Robert F. Kennedy, attended but did not graduate, U.S. senator from New York, 65th U.S. Attorney General, brother of President John F. Kennedy.
Edward M. Kennedy, attended but did not graduate, U.S. Senator (D-MA) 1962–2009. Younger brother of President John F. Kennedy and Robert F. Kennedy.
John Kerr, 1967, author of A Most Dangerous Method,'' editor.
Michael Kolowich, 1970, documentary filmmaker and Internet entrepreneur.
Alvin Lucier, 1949, composer of experimental music and sound installations.
Michael J. Mauboussin, 1982, head of global consilient research at Counterpoint Global, part of Morgan Stanley; author of three books; adjunct professor of finance, Columbia Business School.
Bishop William J. McCormack, 1941, former auxiliary bishop of the Archdiocese of New York (1987); former director of The Society of Propagation of the Faith (1990)
Stryker McGuire. 1965, correspondent, bureau chief, chief of correspondents, Newsweek magazine; editor, LSE Research, London School of Economics and Political Science; London editor, Bloomberg Markets magazine.
Terry McGuirk, 1969, chairman and CEO of MLB's Atlanta Braves; former CEO of Turner Broadcasting System, now vice chairman; recipient of Stuart Lewengrub Torch of Liberty Award from the Anti-Defamation League; Cable Hall of Fame, 2010.
Thomas Mullen, 1992, novelist, recipient of the James Fenimore Cooper Prize for excellence in historical fiction; NPR Best Book of the Year, and has been nominated for two CWA Dagger Awards
Alfonso A. Ossorio, 1934, Philippine-born abstract expressionist who worked closely with Jean Dubuffet and Jackson Pollock.
John E. Pepper, Jr., 1956, former CEO and chairman of the executive committee of the Board of Directors of The Procter & Gamble Company and director of The Walt Disney Company; Vice President of finance and administration at Yale; senior fellow of the Yale Corporation.
William Ruckelshaus, 1951, first Administrator of the Environmental Protection Agency, later became FBI Director and U.S. Deputy Attorney General
Sean Spicer, 1989, former White House press secretary.

See also

Catholic schools in the United States
Higher education
List of Rhode Island schools
Parochial school

References

External links
Portsmouth Abbey official website
Portsmouth Abbey boarding school profile

Pietro Belluschi buildings
Benedictine secondary schools
Catholic boarding schools in the United States
Educational institutions established in 1926
Schools in Newport County, Rhode Island
Catholic secondary schools in Rhode Island
Boarding schools in Rhode Island
Buildings and structures in Portsmouth, Rhode Island
Schools of the English Benedictine Congregation
Roman Catholic Diocese of Providence
1926 establishments in Rhode Island